Seggae is a fusion genre of sega, the traditional music of the Mascarene Islands, and reggae. It was originally created in Mauritius by Kaya (Mauritian musician) and eventually became popular in Mascarene Islands. Seggae is one of the most popular music genres in Mauritius.

Origin
It was invented in the mid-1980s by the Mauritian Rastafari singer Joseph Reginald Topize who was commonly known as Kaya, after a song title by Bob Marley. He campaigned for rights of the Mauritian Creole people. Kaya died in prison in 1999.

A popular Réunionese seggae musician is Baster, and Kaya is the most important and known artist in the seggae genre of music, often being dubbed "Bob Marley of Seggae".

Composition of seggae music 
Seggae music, just as reggae music, can be composed of either just as a guitar, or if played by a band, can constitute of drums, a rhythm guitar, a solo guitar, a keyboard, a bass, percussions and a singer. Unlike reggae, seggae is played at a 4/4 (common time) tempo, and  138 with 140bpm, just like the Sega music. Unlike the Sega music, the rhythmic guitar is played with an offbeat rhythm and the drum's one drop rhythm, faster than reggae. Nowadays, Seggae Artists tend to slow down the bpm to give it a more heavy and soulful touch.

References

Reggae genres
Music of Réunion
Mauritian music
Seychellois music